Kepler-5 is a star located in the constellation Cygnus in the field of view of the Kepler Mission, a NASA project aimed at detecting planets in transit of, or passing in front of, their host stars as seen from Earth. One closely orbiting, Jupiter-like planet, named Kepler-5b, has been detected around Kepler-5. Kepler-5's planet was one of the first five planets to be discovered by the Kepler spacecraft; its discovery was announced on January 4, 2010 at the 215th meeting of the American Astronomical Society after being verified by a variety of observatories. Kepler-5  is larger and more massive than the Sun, but has a similar metallicity, a major factor in planet formation.

Nomenclature and history
Three discoveries made prior to the Kepler mission, which were in Kepler's field of view, were given the Kepler designations 1, 2 and 3. Kepler-5 is actually the second planet-bearing star discovered during the course of the Kepler Mission, a NASA operation that seeks to discover Earth-like planets that transit, or cross in front of, their host stars with respect to Earth. The star's planet, Kepler-5b, was therefore the second of the first five planets to be announced to the public on January 4, 2010 at the 215th meeting of the American Astronomical Society in Washington, D.C., along with planets around Kepler-4, Kepler-6, Kepler-7, and Kepler-8.

Kepler-5b's initial discovery by Kepler was re-examined by scientists at the W.M. Keck Observatory at Mauna Kea, Hawaii; the McDonald Observatory in west Texas; the Palomar and Lick Observatories in California; the MMT, WIYN, and Whipple Observatories in Arizona; and the Roque de los Muchachos Observatory in the Canary Islands.

Characteristics
Kepler-5 is a sunlike star that is 1.374 (± 0.056) Msun and 1.793 (± 0.053) Rsun, and is 137% the mass of and 179% the radius of the Sun. The star has a metallicity of [Fe/H] 0.04 (± 0.06), making it approximately as metal-rich as the Sun, therefore increasing the star's likelihood to have planets in orbit. Kepler-5 has an effective temperature of  6297 (± 60) K, which is hotter than the Sun's effective temperature of 5778 K. Kepler-5 has an apparent magnitude of 13.4, and cannot be seen with the naked eye.

Companion stars
A recent catalog of companions to Kepler stars determined from high-resolution imaging shows two companions to Kepler-5 at distances of 0.9 and 3.5 arc seconds. Whether these stars are physically bound to Kepler-5 or merely chance alignments of unrelated stars is unknown however recent studies have shown that 60 to 80% of companions within 1 arc second of Kepler stars are true binaries.

Planetary system

Kepler-5b is 2.111 MJ and 1.426 RJ. It is, thus, more than twice the mass of Jupiter, and slightly less than three halves of Jupiter's radius. Kepler-5b orbits its star every 3.5485 days, lying at approximately 0.0538 AU from Kepler-5. It is, thus, a Hot Jupiter, or a gas giant that orbits near to its host star. To compare, Mercury orbits the sun at .3871 AU every 87.97 days.  The planet's eccentricity is assumed to be 0, which is the eccentricity for a circular orbit.

See also
 List of extrasolar planets
 Kepler Mission

References

Planetary systems with one confirmed planet
Cygnus (constellation)
18
Planetary transit variables
F-type subgiants